Radomír Blažík (born September 3, 1954) is a Czechoslovak sprint canoer who competed in the early 1980s. At the 1980 Summer Olympics in Moscow, he finished eighth in the C-1 500 m event.

References
Sports-Reference.com profile

1954 births
Canoeists at the 1980 Summer Olympics
Czechoslovak male canoeists
Living people
Olympic canoeists of Czechoslovakia